Kritikos is a Greek surname. Notable people with the surname include:

 Anastasios Kritikos (1914–?), Greek footballer
 Anastasios Kritikos (born 1995), Greek footballer
 Giorgos Kritikos (born 1992), Greek footballer
 Konstantinos Kritikos (born 1991), Greek footballer
 Nikos Kritikos (born 1994), Greek footballer
 Stelios Kritikos (born 1986), Greek footballer